Juraj Haulik de Váralya (20 April 1788 – 11 May 1869) was a Croatian cardinal in the Roman Catholic Church of Slovak ethnicity and the first archbishop of Zagreb. He was also acting ban of Croatia for two separate terms.

Life

He studied theology and philosophy in Trnava, Esztergom and Vienna. After the death of bishop Aleksandar Alagović in 1837, Haulik was proclaimed bishop. In 1840 he began his first term as acting ban of Croatia after the death of ban Franjo Vlašić. He is credited for introducing the Croatian language into schools and workplaces, as well as forming the Matica hrvatska in 1842. He helped the organization of Maksimir park in Zagreb.

He was succeeded as ban by the Hungarian Franz Haller. Haller was brought in to carry on Magyarization in Croatia, which included the banning of the then Croatian banner name: Illyrians. A protest by the Croatian People's Party in 1845 was put out violently by Haller, leaving thirteen protestors dead, and ending his time as ban. Haulik was again called upon to take up the post.

During this term, the Croatian language was made official in the Kingdom of Croatia-Slavonia in 1847. In 1848, in the midst of revolutions in the Austro-Hungarian Empire, military man Josip Jelačić was proclaimed ban to counter Hungarian aims of revoking Croatian autonomy.

Some further autonomy did materialize for Croatia in the following years, as Haulik was proclaimed the first archbishop and metropolitan of Zagreb in 1852. With this, the Catholic Church in Croatia became independent from Hungary. In 1856 he was also named cardinal. He carried on in these posts until his death in 1869.

While he was an ethnic Slovak, he said of his background: I was born a Slovak, but I will die a Croat. In 1999, Croatia and Slovakia put out a joint-issue stamp featuring Haulik.

References

1788 births
1869 deaths
People from Trnava
Croatian people of Slovak descent
Archbishops of Zagreb
Bishops appointed by Pope Gregory XVI
Roman Catholic archbishops in the Kingdom of Croatia-Slavonia
Cardinals created by Pope Pius IX
Croatian cardinals
Slovak cardinals
Bans of Croatia